The  LA Women's Tennis Championships  was a Premier-level tennis tournament on the WTA Tour held in Carson, California, a suburb of Los Angeles. The tournament was played on outdoor hard courts and a part of the US Open Series.

The tournament started out on the inaugural Virginia Slims Tour in Long Beach, California in 1971 by Jerry Diamond, one of the tour's organizers. In 1973, it moved to Los Angeles. The event was off the tour calendar for three years (1974–1976) when the season-ending championships were played in Los Angeles. The tournament was an indoor event until 1983, when it switched to outdoor hard courts in Manhattan Beach where it stayed for 20 years. IMG bought the event from Diamond in 1996. The event was moved to its present location in Carson in 2003. It was acquired by its new landlord, AEG, in 2004.

In 2009 AEG and USTA sold the tournament to Octagon, who moved the event to Carlsbad, California. It was renamed the Mercury Insurance Open.

Past finals

Martina Navratilova was the most successful player winning 8 singles titles.

Singles

Doubles

See also
 Los Angeles Open

References

 

 
Defunct tennis tournaments in the United States
Hard court tennis tournaments
WTA Tour
US Open Series
Recurring sporting events established in 1971
Sports competitions in Carson, California
Recurring sporting events disestablished in 2009
Tennis tournaments in California